Mickey's Racing Adventure is a racing video game developed by Rare and published by Nintendo for the Game Boy Color in 1999. It was followed by Mickey's Speedway USA in 2001.

Gameplay
Mickey's Racing Adventure is a single-player racing game with adventure elements. It is played from an isometric perspective and races consist of land or water tracks.

Development and release
Mickey's Racing Adventure was developed by Rare over the course of approximately six months. It is the company's second Game Boy Color game and its extra mini-games are based on classics such as Loco-Motion. It supports the Game Boy Color's infrared port to transmit data between machines. The game was released in November 1999.

Reception

Mickey's Racing Adventure received positive reviews from critics. IGN reviewer Craig Harris felt that it was Rare's "first real quality Game Boy Color-exclusive title" after their "atrocious" Conker's Pocket Tales, while GameSpot praised the number of tracks and characters to choose from, stating that Mickey's Racing Adventure "shows how Game Boy racers should be done". N64 Magazine said that the game successfully combines the exploration aspects of Rare's Diddy Kong Racing with the racing style of R.C. Pro-Am for the Nintendo Entertainment System, but criticised the lack of a multiplayer mode. Game Informer gave the game an overall score of 8 out of 10 noting the game being well designed, especially for a Disney game, and commenting that the game has plenty of racing courses, characters, power ups and vehicle upgrades concluding "Mickey's Racing Adventure won't take you an exorbitant amount of time to finish, but you’ll like it all the way to the end".

References

External links

1999 video games
Game Boy Color games
Game Boy Color-only games
Mickey Mouse video games
Nintendo games
Racing video games
Rare (company) games
Single-player video games
Video games scored by David Wise
Video games developed in the United Kingdom